Kevin O'Callaghan (born 19 October 1961) is a former professional footballer, who played as a left winger. Born in England, he made 21 appearances for the Republic of Ireland national team scoring once.

Early years
O'Callaghan was born in Havering on the 19 October 1961 to Paddy and Barbara O'Callaghan.

Playing career
O'Callaghan enjoyed two spells at Millwall as well as stints at Portsmouth and Southend. His most successful years came after transferring to Ipswich Town for a record breaking £250,000 in 1980, joining Bobby Robson's revolution at the club. O'Callaghan contributed to Ipswich's victorious 1980-81 UEFA Cup campaign, making five appearances during the run. However he was not part of the squad for the final itself. He also earned a call up to the Irish national team, who he represented on 21 occasions, scoring one goal.

He was in the Portsmouth team that won promotion to the First Division in 1987 after nearly 30 years away, and then signed for Millwall, helping them reach the First Division in 1988 for the first time in their history. They stayed there for two years, and he stayed with them for a season after relegation.

A knee injury brought his career to an abrupt end in 1993.

Coaching career
Following his playing career Kevin came into his own as a coach, at Millwall he helped plenty of talented youngsters reach their full potential including the likes of Tim Cahill.

Other Ventures
O'Callaghan appeared in the 1981 movie Escape to Victory, cast in the unfamiliar role of goalkeeper alongside Michael Caine, Sylvester Stallone and Pelé.

Family life
O'Callaghan currently lives in Kent with his wife Mandy and daughters Kayley and Charlotte.

Honours

Millwall
Winner
 1978/79 FA Youth Cup
 1987–88 Football League Second Division

Ipswich Town
Winner
 1980–81 UEFA Cup

Runner up
 1980–81 Football League First Division (Level 1)
 1981–82 Football League First Division (Level 1)

Portsmouth
Winner
 1986–87 Football League Second Division

See also
 List of Republic of Ireland international footballers born outside the Republic of Ireland

References

External links
Millwall stats
Portsmouth article
Ipswich stats

1961 births
Living people
Republic of Ireland association footballers
Association football wingers
Millwall F.C. players
Ipswich Town F.C. players
Portsmouth F.C. players
Southend United F.C. players
UEFA Cup winning players
Republic of Ireland international footballers
Republic of Ireland under-21 international footballers
English Football League players
Footballers from Dagenham
Association football coaches
Millwall F.C. non-playing staff